Metaponpneumata is a monotypic moth genus of the family Noctuidae. Its only species, Metaponpneumata rogenhoferi, is found in Mexico and Puerto Rico. Both the genus and species were first described by Heinrich Benno Möschler in 1890.

References

Lafontaine, J. D. & Schmidt, B. C. (2010). "Annotated check list of the Noctuoidea (Insecta, Lepidoptera) of North America north of Mexico". ZooKeys. 40: 1–239. 

Acontiinae
Monotypic moth genera